Marco Antwerpen (born 5 October 1971) is a German football manager and former player who last managed 1. FC Kaiserslautern, and former player.

Coaching career
Antwerpen began his coaching career with lower league clubs VfB Günnigfeld and SV Burgsteinfurt. In the 2011–12 season he took over the U19 team of Rot Weiss Ahlen. A year later, he became manager of the first team. After one season, he took a sabbatical, before returning towards the end of the 2013–14 season.

In January 2019 it was announced that Antwerpen and his staff would be leaving 3. Liga club Preußen Münster at the end of the 2018–19 season.

Antwerpen was appointed manager of 3. Liga side Würzburger Kickers in September 2020. On 9 November 2020, after four losses in the league, he was sacked.

Antwerpen became 1. FC Kaiserslautern manager on 1 February 2021. He was sacked on 10 May 2022.

Managerial statistics

References

External links

Living people
1971 births
People from Unna
Sportspeople from Arnsberg (region)
Association football forwards
German footballers
Hammer SpVg players
SC Preußen Münster players
Rot-Weiss Essen players
SC Fortuna Köln players
FC Schalke 04 II players
FC Gütersloh 2000 players
German football managers
SC Preußen Münster managers
2. Bundesliga managers
Rot Weiss Ahlen managers
Eintracht Braunschweig managers
3. Liga managers
Footballers from North Rhine-Westphalia
FC Viktoria Köln managers
Würzburger Kickers managers
1. FC Kaiserslautern managers